Robert Paul Malloy (May 28, 1918 – February 20, 2007) was an American professional baseball player and a relief pitcher in Major League Baseball who played between 1943 and 1949 for the Cincinnati Reds (1943–44, 1946–47) and St. Louis Browns (1949). Malloy batted and threw right-handed. He was born in Canonsburg, Pennsylvania.

In a five-season career, Malloy posted a 4–7 record with a 3.26 ERA and two saves in 48 games pitched, including 35 strikeouts, 26 games finished, and 116 innings.

While pitching for Triple-A Indianapolis Indians in 1948, Malloy went 21–7 and led the International League both in wins and ERA. His team ended with a 100–54 mark.

As of 2006, Malloy holds the lowest ERA (3.26) of any major league pitcher coming out of University of Pittsburgh with more than 100 innings. The next are Doc Medich (3.77), Steve Swetonic (3.81), and Johnny Miljus (3.92).

During World War II, Malloy served in the US Army.

Malloy died in Cincinnati, at the age of 88.

References

External links

1918 births
2007 deaths
People from Canonsburg, Pennsylvania
Cincinnati Reds players
St. Louis Browns players
Major League Baseball pitchers
Baseball players from Pennsylvania
Pittsburgh Panthers baseball players
Birmingham Barons players
Syracuse Chiefs players
Indianapolis Indians players
Dallas Eagles players
Milwaukee Brewers (minor league) players
San Diego Padres (minor league) players
United States Army personnel of World War II